USA-201, also known as GPS IIR-19(M), GPS IIRM-6 and GPS SVN-48, is an American navigation satellite which forms part of the Global Positioning System. It was the sixth of eight Block IIRM satellites to be launched, and the nineteenth of twenty one Block IIR satellites overall. It was built by Lockheed Martin, using the AS-4000 satellite bus.

USA-201 was launched at 06:10 UTC on 15 March 2008, atop a Delta II carrier rocket, flight number D332, flying in the 7925-9.5 configuration. The launch took place from Space Launch Complex 17A at the Cape Canaveral Air Force Station, and placed USA-201 into a transfer orbit. The satellite raised itself into medium Earth orbit using a Star-37FM apogee motor.

It is used to broadcast the PRN 07 signal, and operates in slot 4 of plane A of the GPS constellation. As of 2012 it remains in service.

References

Spacecraft launched in 2008
GPS satellites
USA satellites